Munida acacia is a species of squat lobster in the family Munididae. The species name is derived from the genus Acacia, referring to the spiny exterior margin of the propodi of the second and third pereopods.

References

Squat lobsters
Crustaceans described in 2007